"Early in the Morning" is a song by British band Vanity Fare, released as a single in June 1969. It became an international hit, peaking at number 8 on the UK Singles Chart and number 12 on the Billboard Hot 100 and was awarded a gold disc for sales over one million.

The song reached number 8 on the UK Singles Chart. In the US it peaked at number 12 on the Billboard Hot 100, number 10 on Cash Box and number 4 on the Easy Listening chart and was awarded a gold disc for sales over one million. 
In Canada it reached number 10 on RPM magazine's RPM100 chart and number 4 on the RPM Adult chart.

Release and reception
"Early in the Morning" was the first song to be written by Mike Leander and Eddie Seago together. It was released with the B-side "You Made Me Love You", written by Vanity Fare's Barry Landeman. It was a non-album single in the UK and Europe, but was included on the North American and Australasian album Early in the Morning. Despite its release in June, "Early in the Morning" did not enter the UK Single Chart until the week of 23 July, reaching it peak three weeks later. 

Reviewing for New Musical Express, Derek Johnson wrote: "Take an invigorating gypsy hora dance, and slow it down to mid-tempo – and you'll get some idea of the rhythmic feel of this sparkling item. It's catchy and hummable, with an air of suppressed vitality and carefree abandon. Jogs along merrily and features an attractive vocal blend from Vanity Fare, while the acoustic guitars and clavioline emphasise the Balkan quality. Very easy listening, and a song that's very easy to assimilate".

Charts
{|class="wikitable sortable plainrowheaders" style="text-align:center"
|-
!Chart (1969–70)
!Peakposition
|-
!scope="row"|Australia (Go-Set)
|18
|-
!scope="row"|Australia (Kent Music Report)
|25
|-

|-

|-
!scope="row"|Finland (Suomen virallinen lista)
|18
|-

|-

|-
!scope="row"|Japan (Oricon Singles Chart)
|51
|-
!scope="row"|Malaysia (Radio Malaysia)
|1
|-

|-

|-
!scope="row"|New Zealand (Listener)
|14
|-
!scope="row"|Rhodesia (Lyons Maid)
|6
|-

|-

|-
!scope="row"|US Billboard Hot 100
|12
|-
!scope="row"|US Easy Listening (Billboard)
|4
|-
!scope="row"|US Cash Box Top 100|10
|-
!scope="row"|US Record World 100 Top Pops
|9
|}

Cliff Richard version

Richard recorded two different songs both titled "Early in the Morning".  The first was "Early in the Morning", written by Bobby Darin and Woody Harris, in 1958 for the album Jack Good's Oh Boy!. In May 1969, Cliff Richard recorded a second one, which was a cover of "Early in the Morning" by Vanity Fair, arranged by and featuring the orchestra of Mike Vickers. It was released as a single in various countries, becoming most successful in Japan, where it peaked at number 4 on the Oricon Singles Chart. After its success in Japan, the song was added as the lead track to the Japanese release of Richard's fifteenth studio album Sincerely, released there in December 1969. Elsewhere, it was included on Richard's following studio album Tracks 'n Grooves, released in November 1970.

Release
"Early in the Morning" was first released as a single in the Netherlands in August 1969, with the B-side "Shout", a cover of the Isley Brothers song and taken from Richard's album Don't Stop Me Now!. It was released in Australia and New Zealand in September with the B-sides "Take Action", from the album Sincerely, and "Twist and Shout", from Two a Penny, respectively. It was also released in Japan in September with the B-side "Ooh La La" from the album Established 1958''. "Early in the Morning was also released as a single in France, Italy and Spain with the B-sides "Baby I Could Be So Good at Loving You", "I Get the Feelin'" and "Someday (You'll Want Me to Want You)", respectively. It was also released in South Africa and Rhodesia with the B-side "Rattler".

Richard has said that he was "amazed" that his version was successful in Japan, "because I know that Vanity Fair had made by far the superior record, because I'm a sucker for vocal harmonies and things. And I hadn't really used harmonies too much on my version. But we sold about half a million copies over there and in fact, Vanity Fair didn't get a sale in Japan. And whenever I see them, I feel quite embarrassed". Vanity Fare's version did actually get a release in Japan, selling over 23,000 copies and peaking at number 51 on the Oricon Singles Chart.

Track listings

7" (Netherlands)
 "Early in the Morning" – 2:16
 "Shout" – 3:24

7" (Australia)
 "Early in the Morning" – 2:16
 "Take Action" – 2:08

7" (New Zealand)
 "Early in the Morning" – 2:16
 "Twist and Shout" – 2:38

7" (Japan)
 "Early in the Morning" – 2:14
 "Ooh La La" – 2:52

7" (France)
 "Early in the Morning" – 2:16
 "Baby I Could Be So Good at Loving You" – 3:09

7" (Italy)
 "Early in the Morning" – 2:16
 "I Get the Feelin'" – 2:17

7" (Spain)
 "Early in the Morning" – 2:16
 "Someday (You'll Want Me to Want You)" – 2:21

7" (South Africa and Rhodesia)
 "Early in the Morning" – 2:16
 "Rattler" – 2:47

Charts

Weekly charts

Year-end charts

References

External links
[ Vanity Fare biography] at Allmusic website
 

1969 singles
1969 songs
Vanity Fare songs
Cliff Richard songs
Columbia Graphophone Company singles
Songs written by Mike Leander
Songs written by Eddie Seago